Hydroxyacyl-Coenzyme A dehydrogenase (HADH) is an enzyme which in humans is encoded by the HADH  gene.

Structure

The HADH gene is located on the 4th chromosome, with its specific location being identified as 4q22-q26. The gene has 10 exons. The HADH gene encodes a 34.3 kDa protein that has 314 amino acids and 124 observed peptides.

Function 

This gene is a member of the 3-hydroxyacyl-CoA dehydrogenase gene family. The encoded protein functions in the mitochondrial matrix to catalyze the oxidation of straight-chain 3-hydroxyacyl-CoAs as part of the beta-oxidation pathway. Its enzymatic activity is highest with medium-chain-length fatty acids.

Clinical significance
Mutations in this gene cause one form of familial hyperinsulinemic hypoglycemia.  A deficiency is associated with 3-hydroxyacyl-coenzyme A dehydrogenase deficiency. Mutations also cause 3-hydroxyacyl-CoA dehydrogenase deficiency. There are a wide variety of mutations that have been identified to cause this disease. Among them are missense mutations (A40T, P258L, D57G, Y226H) and nonsense mutations (R236X) in the protein, and splicing mutations (261+1G>A, 710-2A>G) and some small deletions (587delC) in the cDNA. One mutation, 636+471G>T in the HADH gene, was shown to create a cryptic splice donor site and an out-of-frame pseudoexon. Most of the described cases have homozygous mutations. This disease has fairly homogenous clinical presentation across cases. The symptoms first appear in early life, between 1.5 hours post birth and 3 years of age, and the most common symptoms are hypoglycemia and seizures/convulsions directly related to the hypoglycemia. There are other clinical presentations that have been identified, namely: myoglobinuria, dicarboxylic aciduria, feeding difficulties in infancy, muscular hypotonia, hepatic steatosis, growth delay, hypertrophic cardiomyopathy, dilated cardiomyopathy, hepatic necrosis, and fulminant hepatic failure. The disorder may be diagnosed by either the analysis of the molecular genetics of the individual, or by detection of abnormal metabolite levels in blood and/or plasma. Individuals with this deficiency have an elevated amount of 3-hydroxyglutarate excreted through the urine; a heightened level of C4-OH acylcarnitine in the blood plasma is also a characteristic of this FAO disorder. Most documented cases thus far have shown that individuals are responsive to diazoxide treatment, and highlight the need for diagnosis and treatment administration as early as possible in order to correct hypoglycemia and avoid irreversible brain damage.

Interactions 

HADH has been shown to interact with Vpr, such that HIV-1 Vpr regulates mitochondrial respiration and enhances the activity of hydroxyacyl-CoA dehydrogenase (HADH) through PPARbeta/delta.

See also 
 3-hydroxyacyl-CoA dehydrogenase
 hydroxyacyl-CoA dehydrogenase/3-ketoacyl-CoA thiolase/enoyl-CoA hydratase (trifunctional protein), alpha subunit

References

External links 
  GeneReviews/NCBI/NIH/UW entry on Familial Hyperinsulinism